Deepak Verma MBE (b. 11 February 1969) is a British actor, writer and television/film producer of Indian Punjabi descent and Hindu heritage. His role as market-stall trader Sanjay Kapoor in long-running BBC One soap opera EastEnders brought him to the attention of UK mainstream viewers.

Career
Verma trained at the Central School of Speech and Drama. He made his television debut in the Scottish detective series Taggart in 1992. However, he is best known for his portrayal of the adulterous gambler Sanjay Kapoor in the popular BBC soap opera EastEnders (1993–1998). During his time on the show, Verma's character was central to many explosive storylines, including the breakdown of his marriage to Gita (Shobu Kapoor), caused by his extramarital affair with her sister, as well as being falsely accused of her suspected murder. The couple eventually left Walford together in the midst of press scandal.

Since leaving EastEnders in 1998, Verma has set up his own film and television production company, Pukkanasha Films. The company's mission is to develop and produce a slate of innovative, offbeat, fresh and vibrant feature films by drawing on diverse cultural backgrounds, particularly Indian and western.

He has also written several stage plays and screenplays, including Tandoori Chicks, a screenplay about three sisters and their dad's Indian restaurant; Eastside Story and London Gold (BBC films), two high concept feature films; Hitman, a film based on the cult novel by Max Kinnings; and a screenplay entitled Ghostdancing  Based on Émile Zola's Thérèse Raquin, it is a tale of adultery and murder transposed to a small town in the present day.

His first play, Pool of Tranquility, was selected in the finals of the Royal Court Young People's Theatre's young writers' festival in 1992, where it was a finalist. That led to a BBC Radio 4 commission to write a play based on the life of India's most famous bandit, Phoolan Devi, 'Bandit Queen'. He's since penned further plays for Radio 4, the BBC World Service and a play at the King's Head, Islington, London.

Verma was chosen to represent the UK at the Talent Campus at the Berlinale 2004, Berlin Film Festival. He is a member of the European Producers' Club and recently was a participant in RISE (Recontres Internationales Des Scenaristes Europeens). He is currently a participant in the prestigious Eave programmes for European producers.

Deepak won an award for achievement for his contribution to the arts, presented by Keith Vaz MP at the House of Commons in 1997.

Verma continues to act on mainstream television in the UK. Other notable credits include Holby City (2001); White Teeth (2002); River City (2003); Doctors (2003) and All About Me (2003).

He performed in Dominion - Seed of Evil, a US television series.

Deepak has appeared in various theatre shows in the UK as well as training with EAVE in Europe, the film producers' training organisation. Deepak regularly teaches at the Actors' Centre in London and is experienced in leading workshops, including at the Theatre Royal Stratford East and the Tom Allen Centre in London.

His company Pukkanasha Films is producing a film version of 'Wuthering Heights' set in India (Rajasthan), originally produced by Tamasha Theatre company in 2009–2010.

In 2011/2012 he completed a film Called 'Mumbai Charlie', about a community in India who worship Charlie Chaplin. It won the Silver Lei award at the Honolulu Film awards. He and his team worked with local children from underprivileged schools and did drama workshops with them, eventually incorporating them into the 30-minute film.

His plays Ghostdancing, an adaptation of the French Novel Thérèse Raquin, and adaptation of Wuthering Heights have been published by Methuen. The latter is on the reading list for Royal Holloway University's Drama department.

In 2010 Verma conceived Faith Shorts, a global film competition to inspire young people to make short films about their faith. This was developed and produced by the Tony Blair Faith Foundation and is an annual event. Tony Blair said: "By gaining insights into the lives of young people across the world this competition has the potential to build bridges across cultural and religious divides. I hope this competition will provide a platform for creative and talented young people and an opportunity for young filmmakers to see their work promoted on the global stage.” 

Verma was appointed Member of the Order of the British Empire (MBE) in the 2017 Birthday Honours for services to the arts.

References

External links
 Official website
 
 Interview with Deepak Verma 
 Pukkanasha Films

Living people
1969 births
British male soap opera actors
British male film actors
British film producers
Alumni of the Royal Central School of Speech and Drama
Members of the Order of the British Empire
20th-century British male actors
21st-century British male actors
British male actors of Indian descent